Edwina Lau Chi-wai, PMSM (born 29 July 1965) is the head of the National Security Department of the Hong Kong Police Force, and also sits on the Committee for Safeguarding National Security.

Career 
According to an official biography, Lau joined the Royal Hong Kong Police in 1984 and served in various roles relating to narcotics, fraud, commercial crime, human resources management, police training, and police command. She has served as an assistant commissioner of police, regional commander of New Territories South, and as assistant commissioner of personnel.

Lau also formerly served as director of the Hong Kong Police College. In 2015, she was awarded the Police Medal for Meritorious Service.

In March 2019, Lau became a senior assistant commissioner of police, overseeing the work of the Service Quality Wing and the Information Systems Wing.

In 2020, she was appointed Deputy Commissioner of Police (National Security). She took her oath of office, which was witnessed by Carrie Lam, on 3 July 2020.

On 10 February 2021, Carrie Lam awarded Lau the Chief Executive’s Commendation for Government/Public Service for her "significant contribution to safeguarding national security and the implementation of the Hong Kong National Security Law".

In February 2023, Lau said there were "local extremists... hidden in the community" and that they "continue to disseminate seditious and false information on different platforms to instigate others to break the law."

Sanctions 
On 9 November 2020, Lau was sanctioned by the United States under Executive Order 13936 for her role in implementing the National Security Law. Lau responded that she was unfazed by the sanctions and will continue to safeguard Hong Kong and national security. She also called the sanctions "futile".

References

Living people
Hong Kong police officers
1965 births
Hong Kong national security law
Specially Designated Nationals and Blocked Persons List